Jonathan D. Rivera is an American politician who is a member of the New York State Assembly for the 149th district. Elected in 2020, he assumed office on January 1, 2021.

Early life and education 
Rivera was born in Buffalo, New York. He earned a Bachelor of Science degree in business administration from Buffalo State College and working on a Master of Science in political management from George Washington University.

Career 
Prior to his campaign for New York State Assembly, Rivera worked as an administrator for Erie County Public Works. Rivera also works as a liaison to the Erie County Legislature and was a field representative for Congressman Brian Higgins from 2005 to 2007. In December 2019, Rivera declared his candidacy for district 149 in the State Assembly. He placed first in the Democratic primary and defeated Republican nominee Joseph Totaro in the November general election.

References 

|-

Politicians from Buffalo, New York
People from Erie County, New York
Buffalo State College alumni
George Washington University alumni
Democratic Party members of the New York State Assembly
Hispanic and Latino American state legislators in New York (state)
Living people
1986 births